Sund is a municipality of Åland. It is an autonomous territory of Finland which is very rich in history and culture, being one of the official 27 National landscapes of Finland.

The municipality is unilingually Swedish.

The old Medieval post route from Stockholm, Sweden to Turku, Finland passes through Sund.

History and sight-seeing 

Many pre-historic sites in Sund survive from the Stone, Bronze and Iron Ages.

The medieval church of Sund, dedicated to John the Baptist, dates from the 13th century. It is the largest church in Åland.

Kastelholm Castle, the only castle in Åland, is partially in ruins. The castle was built on a small island that was surrounded by water and moats filled with several lines of poles. It was first mentioned in 1388 in the contract of Queen Margaret I of Denmark, where a large portion of the inheritance of Bo Jonsson Grip was given to her. The heyday of the castle was in the 15th and 16th centuries. King John III of Sweden kept his deposed brother Eric XIV in captivity in the castle in the autumn of 1571. Today,  partially restored, it has become a popular tourist attraction. The whole castle opened to the public in 2001.

The Bomarsund Fortress is one of the most interesting historical places in Sund. After Sweden lost the Finnish War of 1808–1809, fought against Russia, both Åland and Finland became part of the Russian Empire. Russia began to build a fortress in Sund in 1830 in accordance with the orders of Emperor Nicholas I. People of various cultural backgrounds came to Sund from all over Russia to build the fortress. A town, Gamla Skarpans, was built and another settlement, Nya Skarpans, was established inside the fortress. However, the fortress, designed for 5000 men and 500 cannon, was never finished: in 1854 during the Åland War, part of the Crimean War, a joint Anglo-French naval force captured and demolished it in the Battle of Bomarsund. Today, in addition to the fortress, there are the ruins of Gamla Skarpans and two watchtowers nearby, all open to visitors. The island of Prästö is located next to the Bomarsund Fortress. The island is known for its six Russian military cemeteries and for two museums show-casing the history of Prästö and Bomarsund.

The Outdoor Museum Jan Karlsgården is next to Kastelholm Castle. There are old buildings from all over Åland, such as windmills, a steam sauna and a blacksmith's shop.

The Prison Museum Vita Björn is also near the Kastelholm Castle. Originally built in 1784 to serve as a prison, it operated until as recently as 1975. Today it is a museum.

Economy 

Tourism is one of the biggest lines of business in Sund. Agriculture is also popular, especially keeping livestock. Small businesses are also abundant and the biggest employers are the municipality and the local golf course.

Notable people
 G. A. Wallin (1811–1852), explorer and orientalist

Image gallery

References

External links

Municipality of Sund – Official website
 Map of Sund municipality

 
Municipalities of Åland